David Bigas Vargas (born 19 June 1994) is a Spanish footballer who plays for UE Llagostera as a left back or left winger.

Club career
Born in Peralada, Girona, Catalonia, Bigas was a CF Peralada graduate. He made his senior debuts in January 2012, representing the side in the Primera Catalana. In the 2012 summer, Bigas joined Girona FC, being assigned to the Juvenil squad. He made his debuts with the reserves in the 2013–14 season, in the regional leagues.

On 9 September 2014, he played his first match as a professional, replacing Christian Alfonso in the 99th minute of a 0–0 home draw against CD Tenerife for the season's Copa del Rey. He made his Segunda División debut on 7 December, starting in a 0–1 home loss against FC Barcelona B.

On 26 March 2015, Bigas was loaned to Segunda División B side UE Sant Andreu, until June. On 14 August, he moved to fellow league team CE L'Hospitalet, also in a temporary deal.

On 4 January 2016, Bigas rescinded with the Albirrojos and signed for UE Olot, also in the third division.

References

External links

1994 births
Living people
People from Alt Empordà
Sportspeople from the Province of Girona
Spanish footballers
Footballers from Catalonia
Association football defenders
Association football wingers
Association football utility players
Segunda División players
Segunda División B players
Tercera División players
CF Peralada players
Girona FC B players
Girona FC players
UE Sant Andreu footballers
CE L'Hospitalet players
UE Olot players
UE Costa Brava players